Cécile Argiolas (born 6 July 1976) is a French fencer. She competed in the women's individual sabre event at the 2004 Summer Olympics.

References

External links
 

1976 births
Living people
French female sabre fencers
Olympic fencers of France
Fencers at the 2004 Summer Olympics
Sportspeople from Toulouse